Taxus globosa, the Mexican yew, is an evergreen shrub and one of the eight species of yew. The Mexican yew is a rare species, only known to be found in a small number of locations in  eastern Mexico, Guatemala, El Salvador and Honduras, and is listed as an endangered species. The Mexican yew is a shrub that grows to an average height of 4.6m. It has large, sharp light green needles growing in ranks on either side of its branches.

There are several projects in order to produce Paclitaxel (an anti-tumor agent) around the world, but Mexican yew has not been as well studied because its low production of Taxol (Bringi et al., 1995)  by in vitro plant cell cultures. Few researchers focus their work on this species, the team leader on Taxus globosa S. is perhaps that of  Barradas  at Veracruz Institute of Technology (Instituto Tecnológico de Veracruz).

References

globosa
Trees of El Salvador
Trees of Guatemala
Trees of Hidalgo (state)
Trees of Honduras
Trees of Nuevo León
Trees of Oaxaca
Trees of San Luis Potosí
Trees of Tamaulipas
Trees of Veracruz
Endangered plants
Flora of the Central American pine–oak forests
Flora of the Central American montane forests
Cloud forest flora of Mexico
Flora of the Sierra Madre Oriental
Flora of the Sierra Madre de Oaxaca
Flora of the Chiapas Highlands